York Township is one of eleven townships in Benton County, Indiana. As of the 2020 census, its population was 155 and it contained 82 housing units. It was organized in June 1860 and named for the state of New York, the former home of local pioneer John Fleming.

Geography

Unincorporated towns
 Raub
 Sheff
(This list is based on USGS data and may include former settlements.)

Adjacent townships
 Parish Grove (south)
 Richland (east)
 Jefferson Township, Newton County (north)

Major highways
  U.S. Route 41
  State Road 71

Cemeteries
The township contains two cemeteries: Blue Ridge and Fleming.

References
 United States Census Bureau cartographic boundary files
 U.S. Board on Geographic Names

External links

 Indiana Township Association
 United Township Association of Indiana

Townships in Benton County, Indiana
Lafayette metropolitan area, Indiana
Townships in Indiana